WIIZ (97.9 FM) is a radio station  broadcasting a Mainstream Urban format. Licensed to Blackville, South Carolina, United States, the station serves the Barnwell, South Carolina & Augusta, Georgia area.  The station is currently owned by Nicwild Communications, Inc.  Its studios are in Barnwell, South Carolina and the transmitter is in Kline, South Carolina.

Programming

Artists heard on this radio station the majority of the time include The Koncrete Boyz, 2 Live Crew, Master Ace, and Usher.  Since 1997, the radio station has aired "The Ol' Skool Ride" daily from 5:25 p.m. to 6:30 p.m.  Artists that are heard during this period include Lipps Inc., Rockwell, Beastie Boys, and MC Hammer.  Classic pop artists such as Madonna and classic rock musicians such as Queen can also be heard at times on "The Ol' Skool Ride". Yo' Girl D.L.(Dark 'n' Lovely) was the station's first Operations Manager/Music Director, as well being an on-air personality under her nickname "Miss Primetime In The Nightime". along with that was future WOSL afternoon jock himself Fredd E. Redd, Bobby Nichols, Suga In The Morning, Tutu The Bad Boy, Corey Hill, with K.D.O., & Rob Black are the personalities that made The Wiz what it is today. The Wiz is home to the Russ Parr Morning Show.

WIZF 101.1 The Wiz in Cincinnati also goes by the name The Wiz and carries the Russ Parr Morning Show as well but is unrelated due to different ownerships.

History
The station went on the air as WAAN on 1993-04-16.  on 1995-10-01, the station changed its call sign to the current WIIZ. Its first actual day on the air was 1996-04-01, with two personalities, Bobby Nichols and Yo' Girl D.L.(Priscilla Annette Gray).

See also

Media in Augusta, Georgia

References

External links

IIZ
Mainstream urban radio stations in the United States
Radio stations established in 1993
1993 establishments in South Carolina